Alex Daniel Tuch (born May 10, 1996) is an American professional ice hockey forward for the Buffalo Sabres of the National Hockey League (NHL). He was drafted by the Minnesota Wild in the first round, 18th overall, in the 2014 NHL Entry Draft.

Playing career

Youth and college
As a youth, Tuch played in the 2008 Quebec International Pee-Wee Hockey Tournament with the Lemieux Academy minor ice hockey team from Phoenix, Arizona. Tuch was ranked 12th by the NHL Central Scouting Bureau on their final list of the top draft-eligible North American skaters leading into the 2014 NHL Entry Draft, where he was projected to be selected in the first round. Tuch was eventually selected by the Minnesota Wild as the draft's 18th overall pick.

Tuch trained with the USA Hockey National Team Development Program team from 2012 to 2014, winning a bronze medal with Team USA at the 2013 World U-17 Hockey Challenge and gold at the 2014 IIHF World U18 Championships.

From 2014 to 2016, Tuch played college hockey for Boston College in the Hockey East Association. He was named to the 2014–15 Hockey East Association Pro Ambitions All-Rookie Team, tallying 14 goals and 14 assists his freshman year. In 2015–16, he contributed with 18 goals and 16 assists in 40 games, while heading to the NCAA Frozen Four with the Eagles.

Minnesota Wild
On April 13, 2016, Tuch signed a three-year, entry-level contract with the Minnesota Wild to begin his professional career. In his rookie professional season, after attending the Wild's training camp, he was reassigned to the club's American Hockey League (AHL) affiliate, the Iowa Wild, for the 2016–17 season. Tuch provided a power-forward presence for Iowa, recording 18 goals and 37 points in 57 games. In the second half of the season, he received his first recall to Minnesota and made his NHL debut on February 4, 2017, against the Vancouver Canucks. That season, he appeared in six NHL games with the Wild, but did not score a goal.

Vegas Golden Knights
On June 21, 2017, Tuch was traded to the expansion Vegas Golden Knights as part of an agreement with Vegas that the team would select Erik Haula in the 2017 NHL Expansion Draft. On October 3, 2017, Tuch was assigned to the AHL's Chicago Wolves to begin the 2017–18 season. He was recalled from the Wolves on October 15, and he scored his first NHL goal against Tuukka Rask of the Boston Bruins that night. Tuch went on with Vegas to the 2018 Stanley Cup Finals, where they eventually lost in five games to the Washington Capitals.

On October 19, 2018, the Golden Knights signed Tuch to a seven-year, $33.25 million contract extension.

In July 2021, Tuch underwent off-season shoulder surgery, which would prevent him from playing the majority of the 2021–22 NHL season

Buffalo Sabres
On November 4, 2021, Tuch was traded by the Golden Knights along with Peyton Krebs, a 2022 first-round draft pick, and a 2023 second-round draft pick to the Buffalo Sabres in exchange for Jack Eichel and a 2023 third-round draft pick. Eichel, the former 2015 second overall draft pick considered a generational talent, had been enmeshed in an acrimonious dispute with the Sabres for some time prior to the trade. Tuch, a Sabres fan as a child, expressed enthusiasm about joining the team. He made his debut in a December 29, 2021 loss to the New Jersey Devils, recording an assist. He soon became a fan favorite in Buffalo, with many citing him as a natural choice to the take up the team captaincy previously stripped from Eichel. A notable game came on March 10, 2022, when Eichel made his first appearance in Buffalo against the Golden Knights, culminating in Tuch stealing the puck from Eichel in the final minute to bury it in the empty net, resulting in a 3–1 Sabres victory.

On October 20, 2022, Tuch scored his first career hat-trick in a 6–3 win over the Calgary Flames.

Personal life
Tuch was born to Carl and Sharon in Syracuse, New York. He grew up in Baldwinsville, New York. Tuch is of Slovak ancestry through his great grandmother. Tuch has a younger brother and sister who are twins; Luke Tuch was drafted in the 2nd round of the 2020 NHL Draft by the Montreal Canadiens and is committed to play hockey for Boston University, and Leah Tuch plays field hockey. Tuch grew up as a fan of the Buffalo Sabres.

Career statistics

Regular season and playoffs

International

Awards and honors

References

External links
 

1996 births
Living people
American men's ice hockey right wingers
Boston College Eagles men's ice hockey players
Buffalo Sabres players
Chicago Wolves players
Ice hockey players from New York (state)
Iowa Wild players
Minnesota Wild draft picks
Minnesota Wild players
National Hockey League first-round draft picks
People from Baldwinsville, New York
USA Hockey National Team Development Program players
Vegas Golden Knights players